The Banjarsari massacre occurred on 15 April 1987, when a 42-year-old farmer named Wirjo killed 20 people and wounded 12 others in the village of Banjarsari in Banyuwangi Regency, Indonesia.

Massacre
The massacre began at Wirjo's home, where he attacked his adoptive son Renny and his friend Arbaiyah, both 4-years-old, with a parang and a sickle. While Renny managed to escape, Arbaiyah was hit in the neck and died. Wirjo then entered the home of Maskur, a neighbour, where he first killed Mrs Maskur with the sickle, before turning on her 80-year-old husband, who tried to help her. Afterwards he made his way through the village, assaulting people at random. Then the people from the village tried to find Wirjo but failed, only to be met by many dead bodies spread across a field. 

By the end of the day Wirjo had hacked a total of 32 people, most of them farmers on the way to their fields and students going to school. 18 of his victims died at the scene, while two others later succumbed to their wounds in hospital. As the culprit was nowhere to be found authorities temporarily suspended classes at local schools, while people locked themselves in their homes.

After an extensive manhunt, including police, dogs, and the army, Wirjo was found the next day just 3 miles west of his house, dangling from the roots of a tree growing over a riverbank. He had committed suicide by hanging himself with his belt.

Victims
Among those killed were:

Tales around the murder
Several tales around the murder had been circulating at the time of the murders. Some could be not be ascertained as factual.

 Police forces which were an extra force sent to help in Banyuwangi were said to have had an accident in Asembagus, resulting in some people dead and injured.
 The ambulances which were supposed to arrive and help the victim were also said to have an accident which caused no help to arrive to help the people in Banyuwangi.
 Before beginning his murder streak, Wirjo had a 40 day fast.
 When the police tried to put down Wirjo's dead body, it's said that the legs moved on its own, causing the police officers to run away.
 According to his Relative, Pak Ogok, the murder was already predicted by an Indigo child in 1965 saying " There will be a bloodbath in 1987 in Watubuntul".
 30 Years after the massacre, the place where people found Wirjo's dead body was said to be haunted.

Background
Wirjo, a 40 year old farmer was the fifth of nine children. According to his wife, Indarah, he loved to drink and gamble and also complained a lot about his inheritance. When reminded of his shortcomings he would get angry and threaten his wife and his mother with sickles (He tried to stab his mother once but his mother managed to dodge and lived). His uncle, Sutedjo, also reported that Wirjo displayed a lot of unnatural behavior. This behavior, such as eating an unnatural amount of rice (He had once eaten a whole 5 kg worth of fried rice and 5 wraps worth of rice) he also loved to eat fried cow blood or also known as "dedeh". The day before the murder Wirjo was reported to have beat his wife during an argument with a whip. 
It was reported that prior to the massacre Wirjo had fasted for a month and that he had also dug up his mother's corpse in the graveyard to gnaw on her bones and 2 days before the massacre began, Wirjo kept on polishing his own sickle for unknown reason.  though other reports indicated no such thing had happened, instead relating that she was still alive at that time.

References

Massacres in 1987
Murder–suicides in Indonesia
Banyuwangi (town)
1987 murders in Indonesia
Mass stabbings in Asia
Massacres in Indonesia